Paul Emanuelli (born 3 January 1984) is a Welsh rugby league footballer who plays for the Coventry Bears in Betfred League 1.

He is also assistant coach at the Scorpions as well as being the Wales u18 head coach. A product of Newport RU youth side he began his rugby career in union with Blackwood RU. After switching to rugby league he joined Blackwood Bulldogs, he has since played for Valley Cougars, Celtic Crusaders Colts where he won the Conference National Division title and South Wales Hornets. In 2012 he joined Valley Cougars as player-coach guiding the club to the 2014 Conference League South title. In 2014 he signed for Championship 1 club South Wales Scorpions at the end of the season he was picked for the Wales national side for matches against France and Ireland. As an amateur he represented Wales Dragonhearts from 2007 to 2013

Internationals 

 25 October 2014   - A v France, Stadium Municipal d'Albi, Albi 22-42 sub
  2 November 2014  - H v Ireland, Racecourse Ground, Wrexham 14-46 sub

References

External links 
 
 
 
 

1984 births
Living people
Rugby league halfbacks
Rugby league players from Newport, Wales
Rugby union players from Newport, Wales
South Wales Scorpions players

Wales national rugby league team players
Welsh rugby league coaches
Welsh rugby league players
Welsh rugby union players